Buddleja tubiflora is endemic to much of northern Argentina, southern Paraguay, and southern Brazil, where it grows at the edge of woodlands, thickets, and in old fields, at low elevations. The species was first named and described by George Bentham in 1846.

Description
Buddleja tubiflora grows to < 2 m  in height, with the typically lax habit creating a spread of < 3 m. The shrub is chiefly distinguished by its striking orange flowers, the corollas 25 mm long by 6 mm wide at the throat, borne in axillary clusters towards the ends of the branches. The branchlets, like the corolla tubes, are covered in a dense reddish indumentum. The leaves are mostly subsessile, lanceolate to ovate-lanceolate, 8 – 18 cm long by 2 – 6 cm wide, membranaceous, tomentulose above, tomentose below. Pollination is by hummingbirds which feed on the sweet nectar at the base of the corolla. Ploidy: 2n = 38.

Cultivation
Buddleja tubiflora is cultivated in the UK, most if not all specimens derived from a long-lost example grown at the Hanbury Gardens at Mortola, Italy. A specimen is grown under glass as part of the NCCPG national collection at Longstock Park Nursery, near Stockbridge. The shrub can be grown on a south-facing wall in coastal areas of the UK, with added protection against frost, although waterlogging overwinter is considered a greater danger to the plant.
Hardiness: USDA zones 9–10.

References

tubiflora
Flora of Argentina
Flora of Brazil
Flora of Paraguay
Flora of South America